Gillway is a council estate in Tamworth, United Kingdom built in the 1950s. It is a small suburb consisting of brick and concrete houses and two storey flats. It has a local school called Flaxhill and a pub called the Tam 'o' Shanter. It also has shops opposite the pub, and is near the Leyfields and the Perrycrofts estates.

Footballer Tony Coton  was born in Gillway at his parents' home, 21 Hawthorne Avenue, on May 19 1961. He also played his junior football for Gillway Boys Club and his school team Flax Hill CP.

Areas of Tamworth, Staffordshire
Housing estates in England